Arthur William Fulcher (7 May 1855 – 17 May 1932) was an English yacht racer and cricketer.

Early life

He was born at Pau, France, the second son of Captain Edward Fulcher of the 87th Royal Irish Fusiliers and educated at Westminster school. He served for twenty years in the Yeomanry, for thirteen years in the West Kent Yeomanry, and seven years in the Suffolk Hussars, retiring with the rank of Honorary Major in 1897. He lived at Redenham Park in Hampshire.

Cricket career
Fulcher was a right-handed batsman who bowled right-arm slow. He made his first-class debut for Kent County Cricket Club against Nottinghamshire in 1878. He made six further first-class appearances for the county, the last of which came against Sussex in 1887. In his seven first-class matches, he scored a total of 156 runs at an average of 14.18, with a high score of 44 not out.

Yachting career
He started yachting in 1886 with the 62-ton schooner Eurelia, followed by the Roseneath, a 95-ton auxiliary schooner, the 119-ton schooner Algeria, and the 27-ton yawl Grade. In 1898 he built a new Roseneath, a 54-ton schooner, with which he competed for the Queen's Cup in 1899 and won the Emperor's Cup in 1899 and 1900. In 1905 he sold the Roseneath, and bought the yawl Xenia, which he rechristened the Kestrel, converting her into a ketch.

Private life
He died at Bayswater in London in 1932 aged 77. His son, Eric, also played first-class cricket.

References

External links

1855 births
1932 deaths
People from Pau, Pyrénées-Atlantiques
People educated at Westminster School, London
English cricketers
Kent cricketers
English male sailors (sport)
People from Appleshaw